Jacarezinho is a Brazilian neighborhood and also a favela with more than 60,300 residents living in an area of 40 ha. The place is located in the North Zone of Rio de Janeiro city, and it borders the neighborhoods of Jacaré, Méier, Engenho Novo and Triagem. It is the third largest favela in Rio de Janeiro, only behind Rocinha and Complexo do Alemão. The favela expanded along with the city's industrialization, and it became the biggest favela in Rio de Janeiro by the mid-20th century, with a population of 23,000 in 1960. The crucial element in its growth was the industrial boom in the nearby Méier district after World War II, according to historian by Julio César Pino, author of a book about the favelas of Rio de Janeiro.

Jacarezinho suffers common favela problems, including violence, poverty and drug dealing. In 2021, at least 25 people were killed in a shootout with police.

Jacarezinho means Little Jacaré, and it is named after Jacaré River. Jacaré is also the Portuguese language name of the yacare caiman, but the river name actually means tortuous, sinuous, and it is not named after the animal.

The favela's samba school is called Grêmio Recreativo Escola de Samba Unidos do Jacarezinho, and it was founded on June 16, 1966. Its colors are pink and white.

The famous football player Romário was born in Jacarezinho.

References

External links
 Revista Época
 Prefeitura do Rio de Janeiro
 An excerpt from Julio César Pino’s book about Jacarezinho, “Family and Favela: The Reproduction of Poverty in Rio de Janeiro”

Favelas
Neighbourhoods in Rio de Janeiro (city)